The Fifty-second Oklahoma Legislature was the meeting of the legislative branch of the government of Oklahoma in Oklahoma City from January 3, 2009, to January 4, 2011, during the second two years of the second administration of Governor Brad Henry. It was the first session in state history where the Republican Party has controlled both houses of the legislature.

Dates of sessions
Organizational day: January 3, 2009
First regular session: February 2, 2009 – May 29, 2009
Second regular session: February 4, 2010 – May 30, 2010
Previous: 51st Legislature • Next: 53rd Legislature

Major legislation

Enacted
Abortion - HB 1595 prohibited a mother from having an abortion based solely on the sex of the child.
Health care - HB 1127 provided $7 million to allow the Oklahoma State University Medical Center to continue to operate.
Sales tax exemption - SB 318 created a gradual elimination of the state sales tax on groceries.
Silver Alert - HB 2030 creates an alert system for senior citizens who have gone missing, similar to the Amber Alert used to find missing children.
Tort reform - HB 1603 required Oklahomans wishing to file a medical malpractice lawsuit to prove before a third party that the case is not frivolous.

Failed
Charter schools - SB 834 would have allowed school districts to easily convert schools into charter schools, a move that would exempt them from most state mandates. The legislation was vetoed by the governor.
Embryonic stem cells - HB 1326 would have made it a crime for a scientist to perform any form of embryonic stem cell research, but was vetoed by Governor Brad Henry.
Insurance - HB 1312 would have mandated insurance coverage for children with autism. It failed to get enough votes for passage in the Oklahoma Senate.
Term limits - HJR 1022 would ask voters to vote on term-limits for all statewide elected offices. The legislation failed in committee.

Added to 2010 ballot as a referendum
English-only - HJR 1042 asked voters whether or not to make English the official language of Oklahoma.
Voting - SB 4 asked voters to decide whether or not to require voters to produce a state-issued ID at the polls.
Workers compensation - SB 609 allowed voters to decide whether or not to require workers compensation judges' appointments to be confirmed by the Oklahoma Senate.

Leadership

Senate
 President of the Senate: Jari Askins (D-Duncan)
 President pro tempore: Glenn Coffee (R-Oklahoma City)

Republican caucus
 Majority Leader: Todd Lamb
 Assistant Floor Leader: Brian Bingman
 Assistant Floor Leader: Mike Mazzei
 Assistant Floor Leader: Clark Jolley
 Whip: Mike Schulz
 Whip: Cliff Branan
 Whip: Anthony Sykes
 Caucus Chair: John Ford

Democratic caucus
 Democratic Leader: Charlie Laster
 Assistant Floor Leader: Jay Paul Gumm
 Assistant Floor Leader: Sean Burrage
 Assistant Floor Leader: Tom Adelson
 Assistant Floor Leader: Tom Ivester
 Assistant Floor Leader: Richard Lerblance
 Whip: Susan Paddack 
 Whip: Debbe Leftwich
 Whip: Roger Ballenger
 Whip: Charles Wyrick
 Caucus Chair: Kenneth Corn

House of Representatives
Speaker: Chris Benge
Speaker Pro Tempore: Kris Steele

Republican caucus
 Majority Floor Leader: Tad Jones
 First Assistant Majority Floor Leader: Ron Peters
 Caucus Chairman: John Wright
 Majority Whip: Mike Jackson

Democratic caucus
 Democratic Leader: Danny Morgan
 Democratic Floor Leader: Mike Brown
 Whip: Ben Sherrer
 Caucus Chairman: Chuck Hoskin

Party composition

Senate

House of Representatives

Membership

Changes in membership during session
July 15, 2009 Ryan McMullen (D) resigns from representing HD-55 to take a federal position as Oklahoma’s director of rural development.
October 21, 2009 Todd Russ (R) is sworn in to represent HD-55, filling the seat vacant from Ryan McMullen's resignation.

Senate

House of Representatives

References and notes

External links
 Oklahoma Legislature Homepage
 State of Oklahoma's Website
 Legislative Bill Tracking Website

Oklahoma legislative sessions
2009 in Oklahoma
2010 in Oklahoma
2009 U.S. legislative sessions
2010 U.S. legislative sessions